is a Tokyo Metro subway station located at the intersection of Omotesandō (Avenue Omotesandō) and Aoyama-dori (Aoyama Street) in Aoyama, Minato ward, Tokyo, Japan. Part of the Chiyoda Line platforms extends into Shibuya ward.

Lines
Omote-sando Station is served by the following three lines.
 Tokyo Metro Chiyoda Line (C-04)
 Tokyo Metro Ginza Line (G-02)
 Tokyo Metro Hanzomon Line (Z-02)

Station layout
There are three levels at this station:
B1: Ginza and Hanzomon Line platforms
B2: Ticket hall / ticket gates / main concourse
B3: Chiyoda Line platforms

All platforms are wheelchair accessible. There is same-direction cross-platform interchange between the Ginza and Hanzomon lines, making this a convenient transfer point on the Aoyama-dōri section of these lines. Passengers who wish to change to the JR lines or the Keio Inokashira Line at Shibuya often change to the Ginza line here; those who want the Tokyu Toyoko Line, the Tokyo Metro Fukutoshin Line or the Tokyu Den-en-toshi Line change to the Hanzomon Line. Ginza/Hanzomon Line passengers must exit the station by going down to the ticket gates; they cannot go directly up to the street.

Platforms
The Chiyoda Line station has one island platform and two tracks. The Ginza/Hanzomon Lines station has two island platforms and four tracks. There are same-direction cross-platform interchanges in the Ginza/Hanzomon Lines station.

History
It became a through station later that year when the section to Shibuya opened on December 20. When through services from the Tokyo Underground Railway (from Asakusa) began on September 16, 1939, the station became . This makes it the only Tokyo Metro station to have been renamed twice.

The Chiyoda Line platforms at Omotesando Station opened on October 20, 1972; the Omotesando name was used to avoid confusion with Meiji-Jingūmae Station, the next stop on the Chiyoda Line toward Yoyogi-Uehara. From 1972 to 1977, Omotesando and Jingumae were separate stations for the Chiyoda and Ginza lines respectively. In 1977, the Ginza Line moved to a temporary station on the northeast side of Omotesando Station, pending completion of the Hanzomon Line platforms. The new platforms for the Hanzomon Line and Ginza Line opened on August 1, 1978. The space used for the old Jingumae Station remains visible from the Ginza Line tunnel as of 2015.

The station facilities were inherited by Tokyo Metro after the privatization of the Teito Rapid Transit Authority (TRTA) in 2004.

PASMO smart card coverage at this station began operation on 18 March 2007.

Surrounding area
 Omotesandō, Aoyama and Harajuku area
 Aoyama Gakuin
 Headquarters of the United Nations University
 Nezu Museum

References

External links

 

Railway stations in Japan opened in 1938
Tokyo Metro Ginza Line
Tokyo Metro Chiyoda Line
Tokyo Metro Hanzomon Line
Stations of Tokyo Metro
Railway stations in Tokyo